Meshell Ndegeocello (born Michelle Lynn Johnson on August 29, 1968) is a German-born American singer-songwriter, rapper, and bassist. She has gone by the name Meshell Suhaila Bashir-Shakur which is used as a writing credit on some of her later work. Her music incorporates a wide variety of influences, including funk, soul, jazz, hip hop, reggae and rock. She has received significant critical acclaim throughout her career, being nominated for eleven Grammy Awards, and winning one. She also has been credited for helping to "spark the neo-soul movement".

Biography
Ndegeocello was born Michelle Lynn Johnson in West Berlin, Germany, to US Army Sergeant Major and saxophonist father Jacques Johnson and health care worker mother Helen. She was raised in Washington, D.C. where she attended Duke Ellington School of the Arts and Oxon Hill High School.

Ndegeocello adopted her surname, which she says means "free like a bird" in Swahili. Early pressings of Plantation Lullabies were affixed with stickers to help pronounce her name. The spelling has changed in the hands of record labels a few times during her career; the correct spelling of her stage name as of 2001 is Meshell Ndegeocello.

Career

Ndegeocello honed her skills on the D.C. go-go circuit in the late 1980s with the bands Prophecy, Little Bennie and the Masters, and Rare Essence. She unsuccessfully tried out for Living Colour's bassist position, vacated in 1992 by Muzz Skillings. Going solo, she was one of the first artists to sign with Maverick Records, where she released her debut album, Plantation Lullabies. This recording presented a distinctly androgynous persona.

Her biggest hit is a duet with John Mellencamp, a cover version of Van Morrison's "Wild Night", which reached No. 3 on the Billboard charts. Her only other Billboard Hot 100 hit besides "Wild Night" has been her self-penned "If That's Your Boyfriend (He Wasn't Last Night)", which peaked at No. 73 in 1994. Also in 1994, Ndegeocello collaborated with Herbie Hancock on "Nocturnal Sunshine," a track for the Red Hot Organization's compilation album, Stolen Moments: Red Hot + Cool. The album, meant to raise awareness and funds in support of the AIDS epidemic in relation to the African American community, was heralded as "Album of the Year" by Time magazine.

She had a No. 1 dance hit in 1996 with a Bill Withers cover song called "Who Is He (And What Is He to You)?" (briefly featured in the film Jerry Maguire) as well as Dance Top 20 hits with "Earth", "Leviticus: Faggot", "Stay" and the aforementioned "If That's Your Boyfriend.. Last Night)". Ndegeocello played bass on the song "I'd Rather be Your Lover" for Madonna on her album Bedtime Stories. Ndegeocello was also tapped, at the last minute, to perform a rap on the same song. This came after Madonna and producers decided to remove Tupac Shakur's rap (which he did while he and Madonna were dating in 1994), after he had criminal charges filed against him. Ndegeocello also performed a rap on Chaka Khan's single "Never Miss the Water", from the album Epiphany: The Best of Chaka Khan, Vol. 1, released in 1996. The song reached #1 on Billboard's Dance Club Play Chart and #36 on the Hot R&B/Hip-Hop Singles Chart.

Her music has been featured in a number of film soundtracks including How Stella Got Her Groove Back, Lost & Delirious, Batman & Robin, Love Jones, Love & Basketball, Talk to Me, Tyler Perry's Daddy's Little Girls, The Best Man, Higher Learning, Down in the Delta, The Hurricane, Noah's Arc: Jumping the Broom, and Soul Men.

She has appeared on recordings by Basement Jaxx, Indigo Girls, Scritti Politti, and The Blind Boys of Alabama. On The Rolling Stones' 1997 album Bridges to Babylon she plays bass on the song "Saint of Me". On Alanis Morissette's 2002 album Under Rug Swept, she plays bass on the songs "So Unsexy" and "You Owe Me Nothing in Return". Also that year, she appeared on Gov’t Mule’s record The Deep End, Volume 2, playing on a cover of The Staple Singers’ song "Hammer And Nails".  And in 2009, she appeared on Zap Mama's album ReCreation, playing bass on the song "African Diamond".

She can also be seen in the documentary Standing in the Shadows of Motown, singing The Miracles' "You've Really Got a Hold on Me" and The Temptations' "Cloud Nine". In the late 1990s, she toured with Lilith Fair. She also did a remake of the song "Two Doors Down" on the 2003 release Just Because I'm a Woman: Songs of Dolly Parton.

Ndegeocello was also a judge for The 2nd, 12th, 13 and the 2015 14th Annual Independent Music Awards to support independent artists' careers.

Her song "Tie One On" was chosen as the Starbucks iTunes Pick of the Week on February 23, 2010.

In 2016, she provided the theme song, "Nova", for the Oprah Winfrey-produced show Queen Sugar. She also collaborated with French-Cuban duo Ibeyi in the song "Transmission/Michaelion" for the album Ash reciting a poem by Frida Kahlo.

In December 2016, the world premiere of Ndegeocello's Can I Get a Witness? The Gospel of James Baldwin, a new theatrical music and art work, was held in Harlem, New York.

In June 2021, The Beatles Channel on Sirius XM Radio began broadcasting A Shot of Rhythm and Blues: Exploring The Beatles and Black Music, a four-part series hosted by Ndegeocello. The series explores the relationship between the English rock band the Beatles and the black musicians that inspired them.

Activism
In 2002, Ndegeocello collaborated with Yerba Buena on a track featuring Ron Black for the Red Hot Organization's tribute album to Fela Kuti, Red Hot and Riot. Proceeds from the album went to various AIDS charities, per the Red Hot Organization's mission.

In June 2010, she contributed a cover of U2's "40" to the Enough Project and Downtown Records' Raise Hope for Congo compilation. Proceeds from the compilation fund efforts to make the protection and empowerment of Congo's women a priority, as well as inspire individuals around the world to raise their voice for peace in Congo.

In 2010, Ndegeocello contributed to the essay anthology It Gets Better: Coming Out, Overcoming Bullying, and Creating a Life Worth Living, edited by Dan Savage and Terry Miller in the vein of the It Gets Better Project.

Personal life
Ndegeocello is bisexual and previously had a relationship with feminist author Rebecca Walker. Ndegeocello's first son, Solomon, was born in 1989. Since 2005, she has been married to Alison Riley, with whom she has a second son. She identifies as an atheist.

Discography

Albums

Singles

Other appearances
1994: Bedtime Stories: "I´d Rather Be Your Lover" (Maverick/Sire/Warner Bros.)
1995: Higher Learning (soundtrack): "Soul Searchin' (I Wanna Know If It's Mine)" (Epic)
1995: Jazzmatazz, Vol. 2: The New Reality: Guru feat. Meshell Ndegeocello "For You" (Chrysalis)
1995: White Man's Burden: "Time Has Come Today" (Chrysalis)
1995: Panther (soundtrack): "Freedom (Theme from Panther)" (Mercury)
1997: Love Jones (soundtrack): Marcus Miller feat. Meshell Ndegeocello – "Rush Over" (Columbia)
1997: Money Talks (soundtrack): "The Teaching" (Arista)
1997: Batman & Robin (soundtrack): "Poison Ivy" (Warner Bros.)
1997: My Melody: Queen Pen feat. Meshell Ndegeocello "Girlfriend" (Interscope)
1998: How Stella Got Her Groove Back (soundtrack): "Let Me Have You" (Flyte Tyme/MCA)
1998: Down In The Delta (soundtrack): "My Soul Don't Dream" (Virgin)
1999: Anomie & Bonhomie: Scritti Politti "Die Alone" (Virgin)
1999: The Best Man (soundtrack): "Untitled" (Sony)
1999: A Day In The Life: Eric Benet feat. Meshell Ndegeocello "Ghetto Girl" (Warner Bros.)
2000: Love & Basketball (soundtrack): "Fool of Me" (New Line)
2002: The Deep End, Volume 2 : Gov’t Mule "Hammer & Nails" (ATO Records)
2003: Go Tell It on the Mountain: The Blind Boys Of Alabama Special Guest Vocals and Piano - "Oh Come All Ye Faithful" (Real World)
2007: Instant Karma: The Amnesty International Campaign to Save Darfur: "Imagine" (John Lennon cover) (Warner Bros.)
2007: Talk to Me (soundtrack): "Compared to What" (featuring Terence Blanchard) (Atlantic)
2012: Black Radio: Robert Glasper Experiment feat. Meshell Ndegeocello: "The Consequences of Jealousy"
2014: All Rise: A Joyful Elegy for Fats Waller: Jason Moran (Blue Note): producer and vocals
2020: From This Place: Pat Metheny Special Guest Vocals - "From This Place" (Nonesuch)

References

External links

Extensive audio interview on public radio program The Sound of Young America

1968 births
African-American women rappers
African-American women singer-songwriters
African-American guitarists
American contraltos
American women guitarists
American funk bass guitarists
American funk singers
American hip hop musicians
American jazz bass guitarists
American jazz singers
American multi-instrumentalists
American reggae musicians
American rhythm and blues bass guitarists
American rhythm and blues singer-songwriters
American rock bass guitarists
American women rock singers
Bisexual feminists
Bisexual singers
Bisexual songwriters
Bisexual women
EmArcy Records artists
Grammy Award winners
Women bass guitarists
American LGBT singers
American LGBT songwriters
LGBT African Americans
Living people
American neo soul singers
Musicians from Berlin
Maverick Records artists
American LGBT rights activists
LGBT rappers
Guitarists from Washington, D.C.
20th-century American bass guitarists
21st-century American rappers
Naïve Records artists
Shanachie Records artists
20th-century LGBT people
21st-century LGBT people
20th-century African-American women singers
21st-century African-American women singers
Singer-songwriters from Washington, D.C.
21st-century women rappers
American bisexual writers